Corby is a surname. Notable people with the surname include:

Ambrose Corbie or Corby (1604–1649), English Jesuit, teacher and author
Colleen Corby (born 1947), American model
Ellen Corby (1911-1999), American actress best known for playing Grandma Walton on the television show The Waltons
Henry Corby (1806-1881), Canadian businessman and politician
Henry Corby Jr. (1851-1917), Canadian businessman and politician, son of the above
John George Howard (1803-1890), born John Corby, English-born Canadian architect, civil engineer and surveyor 
 Kevin Corby (cricketer) (born 1959), English cricketer
 Kevin Corby (soccer) (born 1988), American soccer player
 Kevin Corby (politician) (?–2006), Australian politician
Matt Corby (born 1990), Australian singer
Michael Corby (born 1951), British rock guitarist
Peter Corby (1924-2021), British inventor of the Corby trouser press
Schapelle Corby (born 1977), Australian convicted of drug smuggling in 2005
William Corby (1833-1897), President of the University of Notre Dame and chaplain to the Irish Brigade during the American Civil War